Rear Admiral Eric Green (died 25 January 2014) was a South African Navy officer who served as Flag Officer Fleet from 1999 to 2005, when he retired.

Early life

He attended Hendrik Louw Primary School and matriculated from Hottentots-Holland High School, Somerset West in 1962 where he was a boxer.

Military career 

He started at the Naval Gymnasium at Saldanha Bay in 1963, he attended the Military Academy and graduated from Stellenbosch University in 1966. He served aboard the President Pretorius, President Steyn, President Kruger, Kimberley and Port Elizabeth at a Watch keeping Officer. Green completed Communications - Electronics Warfare course at HMS Mercury. OC SAS Johannesburg. Cdr Green completed the SAAF Senior Command Staff Course in 1982.    He also commanded the supply ship  from 1987-1990.

Commander SAS Simonsberg from 1990-1992 and completed the Joint Staff Course nr 24 during 1990. OC Defence College 1993-1996 with promotion to commodore.Chief of Naval Staff Plans from 1998-1999. 
Inaugural Flag Officer Fleet from 1 Mar 1999 until he retired with pension on 31 Jan 2005. 

His decorations include the Southern Cross Decoration and the Medal for Distinguished Conduct and Loyal Service for 40 years service.

He died in 2014.

Awards and decorations

References

South African admirals
Year of birth missing
2014 deaths
Place of death missing